The 2001–02 season was the 58th season in the history of FC Nantes Atlantique and the club's 40th consecutive season in the top flight of French football. In addition to the domestic league, Nantes participated in this season's editions of the Coupe de France.

Competitions

Overall record

French Division 1

League table

Results summary

Results by round

Matches

Coupe de France

Coupe de la Ligue

Trophée des Champions

UEFA Champions League

First group stage

Second group stage

Statistics

Appearances and goals

|-
! colspan=14 style=background:#DCDCDC; text-align:center| Goalkeepers

|-
! colspan=14 style=background:#DCDCDC; text-align:center| Defenders

|-
! colspan=14 style=background:#DCDCDC; text-align:center| Midfielders

|-
! colspan=14 style=background:#DCDCDC; text-align:center| Forwards

References

FC Nantes seasons
Nantes